John Bruce Yeh (born 1957) is an American clarinetist. He has been the assistant principal clarinetist and E-flat clarinetist of the Chicago Symphony Orchestra since 1977.  Yeh is the founder and director of the chamber ensemble, Chicago Pro Musica, whose first recording, Stravinsky's L'Histoire du soldat, won the 1985 Grammy Award for the Best New Classical Artist.

Early life 
Yeh was born in Washington DC, although he grew up in Los Angeles, California. Yeh's parents were originally from China. Yeh's father was a scientist and a singer. Yeh's mother was a scientist and a pianist.

Education 
Yeh initially studied as a pre-med student at UCLA and also played in local chamber music ensembles and youth symphonies. After two years at UCLA, Yeh transferred to the Juilliard School in New York City.

Career 
In 1977, at age 19, Yeh was hired by Georg Solti as a clarinetist for the Chicago Symphony Orchestra. He started as solo bass clarinetist and two years later was appointed assistant principal and E-flat clarinetist.

While in New York Yeh became a founding member of the New York New Music Ensemble and retained an interest in contemporary music throughout his career. In 1979 he founded the chamber ensemble, Chicago Pro Musica and remains its director. The ensemble's first recording, Stravinsky's L'Histoire du soldat, won the 1985 Grammy Award for the Best New Classical Artist. He has also collaborated with composer and electronic musician Howard Sandroff, performing and recording Pierre Boulez's 1985 work for clarinet and electronics, Dialogue de l'ombre double.
Yeh cofounded INVENTIONS, a visual-musical quartet.

Personal life 
Yeh's first wife was Jody Yeh, a social worker, who is of Jewish descent; they have two daughters, Molly and Jenna. Yeh's second wife is Teresa Reilly, a clarinetist, and together, they have a daughter, Mia. Yeh, his wife Reilly, and his daughter Molly Yeh, a percussionist, perform together on the album Synergy released by Naxos Records in the Naxos Wind Band Classics series.

Recordings
Yeh's recordings include:
Stravinsky: L'Histoire du soldat (also includes works by Rimsky-Korsakov, Walton, Hasenohrl, and Nielsen) – Chicago Pro Musica: George Vosburgh (cornet, trumpet); Daniel Gingrich (horn); Jay Friedman (trombone); Richard Graef (flute); John Bruce Yeh (clarinet); Willard Elliot, (bassoon); Albert Igolnikov (violin); Donald Moline (cello); Joseph Guasgafeste (bass); Easley Blackwood (piano); Donald Koss (percussion). Label: Reference Recordings
Hindemith: Clarinet Chamber Music – John Bruce Yeh (clarinet), Easley Blackwood (piano), Amelia Piano Trio. Label: Cedille Records
Boulez: Dialogues With My Shadow (also includes works by Sandroff, Donald Martino, and Rami Levin) – John Bruce Yeh (clarinet), Howard Sandroff (computer). Label: Koch International Classics
Synergy (works by Daugherty, Burritt, Gillingham, David, and McAllister) – John Bruce Yeh (clarinet), Teresa Reilly (clarinet), Molly Yeh (percussionist), Columbus State University Wind Ensemble. Label: Naxos Records

Awards 
 Frank Sinatra Musical Performance Award.
 1986 Grammy Award for Best New Classical Artist

References

External links
Giacona, Christina (2009), A study of comparative interpretations by Stanley Drucker, Elsa Ludewig -Verdehr, Hakan Rosengren, and John Bruce Yeh of the clarinet concerto by Carl Nielsen. Doctor of Music Dissertation, University of Oklahoma.
Audio: Live from Studio A: John Bruce Yeh. Interlochen Public Radio (2015 interview with Yeh and Yeh playing an extract from Stravinsky's Three Pieces for Solo Clarinet)
 Chicago Symphony Orchestra clarinetist John Bruce Yeh speaks on musicians strike (April 15, 2019)
Interview with John Bruce Yeh, July 9, 1987 [Mainly about the Basset Horn]

1957 births
American classical clarinetists
American musicians of Chinese descent
Living people
Musicians from Chicago
Musicians from Washington, D.C.
20th-century American musicians
20th-century classical musicians
21st-century American musicians
21st-century classical musicians
University of California, Los Angeles alumni
Juilliard School alumni
21st-century clarinetists
Classical musicians from Illinois
Cedille Records artists